The Bailey Hornet is a British aircraft engine, under development by Bailey Aviation of Royston, Hertfordshire for use in powered paragliders.

The engine was publicly introduced in 2013, but as of 2018 does not appear for sale.

Design and development
The engine is a twin-cylinder two-stroke, horizontally-opposed, air-cooled, gasoline engine design, with a helical gear mechanical gearbox reduction drive and a centrifugal clutch. It produces  and weighs .

Specifications (Hornet)

See also

References

External links

Bailey aircraft engines
Two-stroke aircraft piston engines
Air-cooled aircraft piston engines
2010s aircraft piston engines